Canada (AG) v Hislop, 2007 SCC 10 is a leading decision of the Supreme Court of Canada on equality rights under section 15 of the Canadian Charter of Rights and Freedoms and the retroactivity of Charter remedies. The Court struck down provisions in the amended Canada Pension Plan on grounds that it discriminated against same-sex couples. The Act had been previously amended after the ruling in M. v. H..

See also
 List of Supreme Court of Canada cases

External links
 

Section Fifteen Charter case law
Supreme Court of Canada cases
Canadian LGBT rights case law
2007 in Canadian case law
2007 in LGBT history